Cascode Voltage Switch Logic (CVSL) refers to a CMOS-type logic family which is designed for certain advantages.  It requires mainly N-channel MOSFET transistors to implement the logic using true and complementary input signals, and also needs two P-channel transistors at the top to pull one of the outputs high. This logic family is also known as Differential Cascode Voltage Switch Logic (DCVS or DCVSL).

See also
Logic family

References
Weste and Harris, CMOS VLSI Design, Third Edition ((international edition))

Logic families